Hatching Pete is a 2009 Disney Channel Original Movie which first aired on April 24, 2009 on Disney Channel UK and later Disney Channel and Family. It was released on DVD in America on May 12, 2009 together with Dadnapped.

Plot
Brewster High School student Pete Ivey finds that Cammie Poole, his crush, has already been asked out by Dill, the captain of the basketball team. At home, Pete's father tells him that to get Cammie's attention, he has to give her something to notice.

On their way to the Brewster High basketball game, Cammie's brother and Pete's best friend, Cleatus Poole, comes over to ask Pete for a favor. Cleatus is the Brewster High mascot, but he has discovered he is allergic to the suit. He pleads for Pete to wear the chicken suit instead. As part of the bargain, Cleatus tells Pete he will get his sister on a date with him. After a rocky start, Pete realizes that he is attracting Cammie's attention and acts more adventurously inside the suit. Upon seeing his own new-found natural talent for being mascot, Pete agrees to be "The Chicken" full-time. Meanwhile, Pete develops a crush on cheerleader Angela Morrisey. They are both chosen for the parade float committee and become friends while working together on the float.

On the day of the parade, the town shows up for the festival and "The Chicken" is a big hit. During a dance number however, Cleatus is accidentally discovered. Pete, escaping the crowd, steals the sheriff's car to get away. Angela sees him walking and offers him a ride. Angela expresses relief that "The Chicken" is not Cleatus because of her developing romantic feelings for whoever is inside. Based on the adoration that the town shares for "The Chicken" and due to the financial incentives of having people attending the games, the sheriff decides to drop the charges.

Pete returns during the final game to rally both the players and the crowd. During a time out, Pete removes the mascot head at the urging of the audience. Clematis congratulations him for his talent as the chicken and the audience cheers for him as well as Pete’s parents, who express how proud they are of their son. The team finishes with a last second score to win the game, and when the cheerleaders tumble in their celebration, Angela falls on Pete and they kiss. Cleatus tells Pete to put his chicken head back on and join the Brewster Roosters to celebrate their only win of the year.

Cast
 Jason Dolley as Pete "The Chicken" Ivey
 Mitchel Musso as Cleatus Poole
 Tiffany Thornton as Jamie Wynn
 Josie Loren as Angela Morrissey
 Sean O'Bryan as Leon Ivey
 Amy Farrington as Doris Ivey
 Crawford Wilson as Dil Jensen
 Aramis Knight as Wendell Pate
 Edward Herrmann as The Principal
 Brian Stepanek as Coach Mackey
 Madison Riley as Cammie Poole

Reception
The premiere of the movie was viewed by 4.1 million viewers, becoming the third Disney movie in three years with less than 5 million viewers for the premiere.

David Nusair called the movie (along with Dadnapped) "typically underwhelming Disney Channel fare."

References

External links

Disney Channel Original Movie films
2000s American films
2000s English-language films
2000s teen comedy films
2009 films
2009 television films
American basketball films
American teen comedy films
American comedy television films
Films directed by Stuart Gillard
Films scored by Nathan Wang
English-language comedy films